The American sketch comedy TV series Saturday Night Live, which debuted on NBC in 1975 and remains in production as of 2023, has made several efforts to develop some of the more popular sketches into feature-length films, with varying degrees of commercial and critical success. The first foray into film came with the successful Aykroyd and Belushi vehicle, The Blues Brothers (1980), which earned over $115 million on a $27 million budget.

In 1990, Lorne Michaels oversaw the writing of a sketch anthology feature film titled The Saturday Night Live Movie with many of the show's then-current writing staff, including Al Franken, Tom Davis, Greg Daniels, Jim Downey, Conan O'Brien, Robert Smigel, and George Meyer, contributing. The screenplay only got as far as a Revised First Draft dated July 26, 1990 before being abandoned.

The success of Wayne's World (1992) encouraged Michaels to produce more film spin-offs, based on several popular sketch characters. Michaels revived 1970s characters for Coneheads (1993), followed by It's Pat (1994); Stuart Saves His Family (1995); A Night at the Roxbury (1998); Superstar (1999), and The Ladies Man (2000). Most of the films were box office and critical failures, notably It's Pat, which did so badly at the box office that the studio that made the film, Touchstone Pictures, pulled it only one week after releasing it.

Films

Reception

Box office performance

Critical response

References

Films
Saturday Night Live